14-Methoxymetopon is an experimental opioid drug developed by a team led by Professor Helmut Schmidhammer at the University of Insbruck in the mid 1990s. It is a derivative of metopon in which a methoxy group has been inserted at the 14-position. It is a highly potent analgesic drug that is around 500 times stronger than morphine when administered systemically; however, when given spinally or supraspinally, it exhibits analgesic activity up to a million fold greater than morphine. It binds strongly to the μ-opioid receptor and activates it to a greater extent than most similar opioid drugs. This produces an unusual pharmacological profile, and although 14-methoxymetopon acts as a potent μ-opioid full agonist in regard to some effects such as analgesia, a ceiling effect is seen on other effects such as constipation and respiratory depression which is believed to involve interaction with the κ-opioid receptor

See also 
 14-Methoxydihydromorphinone

References 

4,5-Epoxymorphinans
Ethers
Ketones
Mu-opioid receptor agonists
Opioids
Phenols
Semisynthetic opioids